Bijay Kumar Singh  is a Nepali politician belonging to Terai Madhesh Loktantrik Party. He is also a former member of Constituent Assembly and was elected under proportional list.

He is the founding leader of Terai Madhesh Loktantrik Party.

See also 
 Brikhesh Chandra Lal

References 

People from Mahottari District
Terai Madhesh Loktantrik Party politicians
Nepali Congress politicians from Madhesh Province
Members of the 2nd Nepalese Constituent Assembly